"Boyfriend" is a song co-written and recorded by American country music artist RaeLynn. It was released on December 17, 2012 as her debut single.

Critical reception
Billy Dukes of Taste of Country gave the song a four-star review, saying "Don’t trust that grapefruit-sized flower growing from RaeLynn‘s platinum blonde hair. This girl and her first single ‘Boyfriend’ are absolute country trouble with a capital “T.” But rarely has trouble sounded this much fun."

Chart performance

References

2012 debut singles
2012 songs
RaeLynn songs
Songs written by Nicolle Galyon
Song recordings produced by Joey Moi